Sir William Macnamara Goodenough, 1st Baronet DL  (10 March 189923 May 1951) was a British banker. He served as the Chairman of Barclays Bank from 1947 to 1951.

Early life
William Macnamara Goodenough was born in 1899. He was the son of Frederick Goodenough, who had been chairman of Barclays Bank from 1917 to 1934. He was educated at Wellington College and the University of Oxford (Christ Church).

Career
Goodenough served as the Chairman of Barclays Bank from 1947 to 1951.

Death and legacy
Goodenough died in 1951. He was succeeded to the title by his son, Sir Richard Edmund Goodenough, 2nd Baronet (1925–1996).

References

1899 births
1951 deaths
People educated at Wellington College, Berkshire
Alumni of Christ Church, Oxford
Barclays people
British chairpersons of corporations
Chairmen of Barclays
Deputy Lieutenants of Oxfordshire
Baronets in the Baronetage of the United Kingdom
William Macnamara